William Thomas Ahern (25 June 1874 – 27 January 1920) was an Australian rules footballer who played with St Kilda in the Victorian Football League (VFL).

Family
The son of Patrick Ahern, and Elizabeth Caroline Ahern (1840-1906), née White, William Thomas Ahern was born in Collingwood on 25 June 1874.

He married Annie Amelia Alberta Spry (1872-1962) in 1899.

Education
He was educated at Scotch College (1887), and at Melbourne Grammar School (1888-1894). He was captain of Melbourne Grammar's football and cricket teams.

Football
He had already played for two Victorian Football Association (VFA) clubs before joining St Kilda in 1896. He began his VFA career at Fitzroy in 1893, then crossed to Melbourne in 1895.

He made his VFL debut for St Kilda in the opening round of the inaugural VFL season in 1897 and played a total of 12 games. Along with Reg Stewart, Ahern was St Kilda's joint leading goal-kicker that year, with six goals.

Death
He died at Stratford, Victoria on 27 January 1920.

Footnotes

References
 Holmesby, Russell & Main, Jim (2007). The Encyclopedia Of AFL Footballers. BAS Publishing. .

External links
 
 
 Bill Ahern, Demonwiki.

1874 births
Australian rules footballers from Melbourne
Fitzroy Football Club (VFA) players
Melbourne Football Club (VFA) players
St Kilda Football Club players
1920 deaths
People from Collingwood, Victoria
People educated at Scotch College, Melbourne
People educated at Melbourne Grammar School